The 2015 East Carolina Pirates football team represented East Carolina University in the 2015 NCAA Division I FBS football season. They were led by sixth-year head coach Ruffin McNeill and played their home games at Dowdy–Ficklen Stadium. This was East Carolina's second season as members of the Eastern Division of the American Athletic Conference. They finished the season 5–7, 3–5 in AAC play to finish in fifth place in the East Division.

McNeill was fired at the end of the season. He finished with a six-year record of 42–24.

Schedule

Schedule Source:

Game summaries

Towson

at Florida

at Navy

Virginia Tech

at SMU

at BYU

Tulsa

Temple

at UConn

South Florida

at UCF

Cincinnati

References

East Carolina
East Carolina Pirates football seasons
East Carolina Pirates football